Jim Bob Bizzell (born November 22, 1985) is a Paralympian athlete from the United States competing mainly in category T44 sprint events.

He competed in the 2008 Summer Paralympics in Beijing, China. There he won a gold medal in the men's 4 x 100 metre relay (T42-46 event), a silver medal in the men's 200 metres (T44 event), and a silver medal in the men's 400 metres (T44 event).

References

External links
 
 Profile on U.S. Paralympics

Paralympic track and field athletes of the United States
Athletes (track and field) at the 2008 Summer Paralympics
Paralympic gold medalists for the United States
Paralympic silver medalists for the United States
American male sprinters
Living people
1985 births
Medalists at the 2008 Summer Paralympics
Paralympic medalists in athletics (track and field)